Prathap (also known as Kuri Prathap) is an Indian actor in the Kannada film industry.  He made his debut in the movie Sixer (2007), and went on to cast in many commercial films. Some  films Prathap worked as an actor include Mylari (2010), Godfather (2012), Brindavana (2013), and Auto Raja (2013).

Career
Prathap has been part of more than 140+ Kannada feature films and has featured on a popular Kannada prank show, telecast on Udaya TV channel, called Kuri Bond

Filmography
Prathap has appeared in the following films:
Poojari
 Sixer
 Anatharu
 Sathya In Love
 Navagraha
Mylari (2010)
Mr.420
Jai Lalitha
Godfather (2012)
 Brindavana (2013) 
Victory
 Auto Raja (2013)
 Sakath (2021)
 Raam  (2009)

See also

List of people from Karnataka
Cinema of Karnataka
List of Indian film actors
Cinema of India

References

External links

Male actors in Kannada cinema
Indian male film actors
Male actors from Karnataka
20th-century Indian male actors
21st-century Indian male actors
Living people
Year of birth missing (living people)
Place of birth missing (living people)